Harir is a town and sub-district in Erbil Governorate in Kurdistan Region, Iraq. The town is located in the Shaqlawa District.

In the town, there was a church of Mar Yohanna.

History
Harir is mentioned by Evliya Çelebi in Seyahatnâme in the 17th century as part of Kurdistan. The district was ruled by Mir Xanzad of the Soran Emirate during the reign of the Ottoman Sultan Murad IV. The town was rebuilt in 1928 by Assyrian refugees, all of whom were adherents of the Church of the East and were originally from Shemsdin in the Hakkari mountains in Turkey, after they had departed the refugee camp at Baqubah in the aftermath of the Assyrian genocide in the First World War. The church of Mar Yohanna was built soon after.

By 1938, Harir was inhabited by 485 Assyrians in 78 families. The town was destroyed and its population displaced by pro-government militia, who settled at Harir, in 1963 during the First Iraqi–Kurdish War, prior to which there were over 90 Assyrian households. The discovery of a mass grave, in which 37 Assyrians from Harir were buried, was announced by Kurdistan Regional Government's Minister of Human Rights on 18 February 2006. 

A concentration camp was later established at Harir by the Iraqi government and used to intern over 300 Kurdish families of the Barzani tribe from the village of Argush who were forcibly deported there on 26 June 1978. Amidst the 2003 invasion of Iraq, over one thousand paratroopers of the US 173rd Airborne Brigade landed at the airfield at Harir via airdrop on 26 March as part of Operation Northern Delay.

Notable people
Ali Hariri (1425–), Kurdish poet
Franso Hariri (1937–2001), Assyrian politician
Fawzi Hariri (b. 1958), Assyrian politician

References

Bibliography

Historic Assyrian communities in Iraq 
Populated places in Erbil Governorate
Kurdish settlements in Iraq
Subdistricts of Iraq